Robert Galloway and Roberto Maytín were the defending champions but only Maytín chose to defend his title, partnering Jackson Withrow. Maytín lost in the final to Diego Hidalgo and Martin Redlicki.

Hidalgo and Redlicki won the title after defeating Maytín and Withrow 6–2, 6–2 in the final.

Seeds

Draw

References

External links
 Main draw

Kentucky Bank Tennis Championships - Men's Doubles
2019 Men's Doubles